The MMN-1 is a small Georgian Claymore type directional anti-personnel fragmentation mine. The mine projects fragments in a sixty degree horizontal arc to a casualty radius of 15 meters.

Specifications
 Weight: 0.8 kg
 Length: 140 mm
 Depth: 75 mm
 Height: 100 mm
 Explosive content: 0.2 kg

References
 Jane's Mines and Mine Clearance 2005-2006

Anti-personnel mines